Thomas Radcliffe (died 1403), or Thomas de Radcliffe of Radcliffe Tower, of Winmarleigh and Astley, Lancashire, England, was a Member of Parliament for Lancashire in 1385 and 1395.

References

14th-century births
1403 deaths
Members of the Parliament of England (pre-1707) for Lancashire
English MPs 1385
English MPs 1395